Darren Close is an Australian comics creator. He has primarily self-published comics about his character Killeroo for the last 20 years, most recently the GANGWARS anthology He also founded the OzComics website, which later became a weekly drawing challenge on Facebook.  Among other achievements, the website held an auction to raise funds to help Gary Friedrich, co-creator of the supernatural motorcyclist, Ghost Rider, after he was countersued by publisher Marvel when he tried to regain rights to the character.

References

Australian comics writers
Living people
Year of birth missing (living people)